is a former Japanese volleyball player. She plays for the Japan women's national volleyball team. She competed at the 2020 Summer Olympics, in Women's volleyball.

In 2022, She announced her marriage on social media.

Career 
She participated in the 2017 FIVB Volleyball Women's World Grand Champions Cup the 2017 FIVB Volleyball World Grand Prix, and the 2019 Montreux Volley Masters.

Awards

Individual
 2019 Montreux Volley Masters "Best Libero"

References

External links 
 Player profile, FIVB
 Asian Senior Women’s Volleyball Championship tournament team, Volleymob
  Mari Horikawa, Getty

1990 births
Living people
Japanese women's volleyball players
Volleyball players at the 2018 Asian Games
Volleyball players at the 2020 Summer Olympics
Asian Games competitors for Japan
Olympic volleyball players of Japan